Anthony Musto (born October 13, 1968) is an American politician who served in the Connecticut State Senate from the 22nd district from 2009 to 2015.

References

1968 births
Living people
Democratic Party Connecticut state senators